George J. Saling (July 27, 1909 – April 15, 1933) was an American track and field athlete, winner of 110 m hurdles at the 1932 Summer Olympics.

Saling was born in Memphis, Missouri, but the family moved to Corydon, Iowa when George was three months old. He graduated from Corydon High School in 1927 and was the captain of the basketball team. At the University of Iowa, Saling established himself as a world class hurdler during his senior year, in 1932, winning the NCAA Championships in 110 m hurdles, equaling the Percy Beard's world record of 14.4.

At the Los Angeles Olympic Games, Saling beat his chief rival, Percy Beard, in the semi-final by 0.2 seconds and then again in the final by 0.1 seconds.

That would remain his last victory on the track, because George Saling was killed in a car accident in Missouri six months after the Olympic Games, aged only 23.

References

1909 births
1933 deaths
People from Corydon, Iowa
American male hurdlers
Iowa Hawkeyes men's track and field athletes
University of Iowa alumni
Road incident deaths in Missouri
Track and field athletes from Iowa
Athletes (track and field) at the 1932 Summer Olympics
Medalists at the 1932 Summer Olympics
Olympic gold medalists for the United States in track and field
People from Memphis, Missouri